Taiari / Chalky Inlet is one of the southernmost fiords in Fiordland, in the southwestern corner of New Zealand's South Island and part of Fiordland National Park. As with the neighbouring fiords of Tamatea / Dusky Sound to the north and Rakituma / Preservation Inlet to the south, Taiari / Chalky Inlet is a complex fiord with many channels and islands along its roughly  length.

Despite its remoteness, Taiari / Chalky Inlet has seen frequent waves of human interaction. Early European accounts suggest that a population of Māori inhabited the fiord for a time, while battles between iwi are said to have taken place in neighbouring Rakituma, but the extent of this habitation is not known. The fiord was regularly visited by Europeans during the late 18th and early 19th centuries, with explorers including James Cook and Jules de Blosseville giving many of the features their European names. As with the rest of the Fiordland coast, the fiord was briefly inhabited by crews of whalers and sealers, until declines in the population of these animals made the industry uneconomic by the 1830s.

Following the collapse of the whaling industry, Taiari has remained largely uninhabited. Occasional expeditions to the fiord were primarily for research or tourism, with photographs taken in the fiord during the late 19th century contributing to the campaign to establish the area as a national park. Unlike more developed fiords to the north (such as Milford Sound / Piopiotahi or Doubtful Sound / Patea), Taiari / Chalky Inlet has no land access, limiting human interaction to sea or air. This, along with pest control efforts on the islands within the fiord, has allowed for populations of native species to recover, although a number of invasive species remain a threat.

Geography

The geography of Taiari / Chalky Inlet is complex, as it is for the neighbouring fiord complexes of Tamatea / Dusky Sound to the north and Rakituma / Preservation Inlet to the south. There are two main entrances to the fiord from the Tasman Sea, separated by a string of islands – the Eastern Passage, which continues in a northerly direction into the main channel of Taiari / Chalky Inlet, and the Western Passage, which is connected to the eastern and main channel via a number of passages between islands. These include Bad Passage (separating Chalky Island and Motutawaki), Return Channel (separating Motutawaki and Great Island), and North Port (separating Great Island from the South Island mainland). 

Islands of varying sizes are found in the sound, including those at the entrance, which separate the Eastern and Western passages. Chalky Island (or Te Kākahu-o-Tamatea, so named as it was said to be the location where the explorer Tamatea laid down his cloak, or kākahu, to dry) is the most seaward of these, with both the island and the sound owing their English names to the white cliffs found on the island's seaward southern edge. Further from the sea are the Passage Islands, the largest of which is known as Motutawaki, from the Māori words motu for 'island' and tawaki, referring generally to large penguins such as the Fiordland crested penguin. Little Island sits in the narrow channel between Great Island and the South Island. Closer to the mouth, the Garden islands are another small group, located on the eastern edge of the fiord, at the entrance to South Port.

Approximately  from the fiord's mouth, the fiord splits in two. Moana-whenua-pōuri / Edwardson Sound continues the roughly north–south orientation of the main length of Taiari, whilst Te Korowhakaunu / Kanáris Sound runs roughly perpendicular to this in an east–west orientation. The head between these two fiords, on the northern edge of Te Korowhakaunu and the eastern edge of Moana-whenua-pōuri, is known as Divide Head in English, and Te Tapuwae-o-Māui (the footstep of Māui) in Māori. This name, as well as others in the area (such as Te Rereka-o-Māui to describe the hills behind Divide Head), refers to the Māori creation myth for the fiord. In this, the demigod Māui is said to have leapt ashore at Te Tapuwae-o-Māui (representing his footprint, while Te Rereka-o-Māui is his leap), where he slipped over. In one account, his extended arms created both Te Korowhakaunu and Moana-whenua-pōuri, while in another Te Korowhakaunu already existed and the mud and water kicked up when Māui's foot slipped created Moana-whenua-pōuri.

Te Korowhakaunu / Kanáris Sound
A small string of islands, the Small Craft Harbour Islands, lies close to the sound's junction with the main channel of Taiari /Chalky Inlet.

At its head, the fiord is split into two smaller coves, separated by the aptly-named Two Cove Head. The northernmost of these, Islet Cove, is fed by the Carrick River, one of the largest inflows into the entire complex. The other cove, Cliff Cove, does not have any inflows of the same degree. However, the cove marks the closest point between the Chalky Inlet complex and that of neighbouring Rakituma / Preservation Inlet, at just over 500 metres from Te Awaroa / Long Sound. The isthmus between the two fiords constitutes part of the Dark Cloud Range, which extends seaward to form the southern side of Te Korowhakaunu / Kanáris Sound and the eastern edge of Taiari / Chalky Inlet. The name Cunaris Sound stems from this expedition, although the exact entomology is unclear. It was previously believed to be derived from the plural of the French name for the canary, canaris, in reference to the songbirds and mōhua (yellowheads) prevalent in the area at the time. However, evidence has since suggested that the fiord was instead named after Konstantinos Kanaris, a hero of the Greek War of Independence, and in 2021 the spelling of the European portion of the name was altered to Kanáris Sound to reflect this naming origin.

To the north of Kanáris Sound lie two hill formations, separated by a small glacial valley. These constitute the Tower Hills on the east and Te Rereka-o-Māui on the west, and consist of primarily schist and greywacke, with small portions of gneiss.

Moana-whenua-pōuri / Edwardson Sound
The hills that constitute the northern edge of Kanáris Sound also form the eastern edge of Moana-whenua-pōuri / Edwardson Sound.

The northern limit of the fiord consists of a small sheltered cove known as Lake Cove, into which the two primary tributaries of this branch flow. To the east of the cove, Cora Lynn Falls drain the outflow from a series of lakes (from upstream to downstream, lakes Purser, Carrick, and Cadman) that extend towards Tamatea / Dusky Sound. The second inflow into Lake Cove is Lumaluma Creek, which drains a large catchment area including multiple small tarns. Numerous small creeks flow along both edges of the fiord, fed by the 2-4 metres of rain which fall around the fiord annually. 

Moana-whenua-pōuri is significantly shallower than either Chalky Inlet or Kanáris Sound. Unlike many of the other fiords in the region, including the others in the Taiari complex, this fiord gets progressively shallower from its mouth, with no basins to speak of.

History
Not much is known about Māori habitation of Fiordland prior to the arrival of Europeans. The conditions in Fiordland were not hospitable to ongoing habitation, although expeditions for exploration, hunting, and gathering of resources such as pounamu took place soon after the arrival of Māori in New Zealand, roughly 800 years ago. More permanent occupation took place in the 18th century, when remnants of the iwi (tribe) Kāti Māmoe fled into the area following a Ngāi Tahu conquest of the South Island. Two battles are said to have taken place in neighbouring Rakituma / Preservation Inlet around 1780 between the iwi, indicating the extent to which Kāti Māmoe were pursued. Evidence of Māori habitation in the fiords is noted by many European explorers from this point and has been identified through archaeological studies of Fiordland, indicating that occupation may have become permanent for a period.

Captain James Cook was the first European to see Taiari / Chalky Inlet during the second voyage in 1773, naming both it and Chalky Island after the white cliffs on the island's seaward side. Cook did not enter the fiord, owing to the poor weather conditions, and sailed past en route to Tamatea / Dusky Sound. The first Europeans known to have entered and explored the complex came in 1813, when the cutter Snapper entered the fiord and established a camp for a number of months. The crew of the Cutter made camp in the upper reaches of Edwardson Sound, which they so named after the ship's captain, Captain Edwardson. After a stay of a few months, the Cutter left to continue its mission of maintaining supply depots around the region. Upon its return in 1820, Edwardson's account described the environment around Lake Cove and the changes which he witnessed from his first experience. The cove, which had been a lagoon impossible to enter by ship on their first visit due to dangerous tides and silt, had opened up into a deep harbour large enough to hold a whaling ship, with two large river inflows instead of one.

Notes from Edwardson's visits were incorporated into a comprehensive account of the region by Jules de Blosseville, part of an 1826 French expedition. The French expedition named a number of features, although the majority of these have since been replaced by English or Māori names. These include Presqu'île le Chevalier at the northern edge of Western passage (now Cape Providence) and Presqu'île Bréauté (now the Treble Mountain peninsula). Other names, such as Kanáris Sound or Puysegur Point (in neighbouring Preservation Inlet) have been adapted from the French names from this expedition.

From this point, European activity in the region came in waves, due in equal parts to economic and scientific endeavours. Sealers and whalers frequented the Fiordland coast throughout the 1820s and 1830s, although this came to a quick end by the end of the 1830s due to severe depletion of the seal and whale populations making the activities uneconomic. The area was surveyed again around 1850 by the HMS Acheron under Captain John Lort Stokes. One of the first accounts of the geological composition of the region was made by the ship's surgeon, who noted the occurrence of pink granite and the presence of coal. Further expeditions by other Europeans into the 1860s and 1870s built on this work, identifying with greater detail the distribution of potentially valuable resources within the region. This culminated in a brief gold rush and attempt at permanent settlement in Rakituma / Preservation Inlet during the 1880s, however despite reports of similar deposits in the headwaters of Taiari / Chalky Inlet, the activity did not spread and quickly dissipated.

At the same time as these numerous sea-based voyages into the fiords, attempts at land-based expeditions were also undertaken. The most prevalent of these was that of Alfred Henry Burton, a Dunedin-based photographer and part of the Burton Brothers photographic studio. Burton travelled extensively within Fiordland (as well as the rest of New Zealand) and made several trips during his career by both land (on horseback) and sea. His photographs of the unspoilt environment contributed to the campaign to establish the area as a National Park, which was eventually established as a "National reserve" in 1904 before officially becoming New Zealand's third national park with the passage of the National Parks Act 1952. 

Since this, Taiari / Chalky Inlet has been largely untouched. Its isolation has prevented the development seen in fiords further north, such as Milford Sound / Piopiotahi or Doubtful Sound / Patea. There is no land route to the fiord, even by foot, so human interaction is limited to sea or occasionally air access. Efforts have also been made in recent years to restore the cultural history of Māori within Fiordland. This culminated in 2019 with the renaming of multiple fiords to dual names, including the renaming of Chalky Inlet to the dual Taiari / Chalky Inlet.

Ecology
 Despite Taiari / Chalky Inlet's remote location, it did not escape the ecological impact of human settlement. The whale and seal populations of the fiord were decimated by hunters during the early 19th century, leading to the eventual local collapse of the industry by the 1830s. As with the rest of New Zealand, a number of invasive species  including stoats, rats and possums  have been found in the area around the fiord. The presence of such pests has had a significant impact on native wildlife, with many species now either entirely absent or confined to predator-free offshore islands in the fiord.

In the years since human interaction shifted from primarily economic to scientific and environmental, efforts have been made to restore the environment and reduce the impact of human settlement. A 1977 study identified a number of invasive species to remove from the area, including noting the impact of deer on the area. Invasive species remain a threat to the fiord complex, with the invasive seaweed Undaria discovered in 2019. Owing to the small amount detected, active efforts are in place to eradicate Undaria from the fiord with control measures around the area in place. 

Pest control efforts on the islands in Taiari / Chalky Inlet have led to the eradication of pests from Great Island, the Passage Islands (including Motutawaki) and Chalky Island, with the latter three having been declared predator free since 1999. This has allowed the islands to become a sanctuary for many native species which have been reintroduced to the area since 2002, including the mōhua, orange-fronted kākāriki, little spotted kiwi, and tīeke. Chalky Island is also home to the Te Kakahu skink, an endemic skink discovered in 2002 and confirmed as a separate species in 2011. The fiord also contains evidence of multiple petrel colonies, like many other fiords in the area.

See also
 List of fiords of New Zealand

References

Fiords of New Zealand
Important Bird Areas of New Zealand
Sounds of Fiordland